Sarah Lind (born July 22, 1982) is a Canadian actress. She is known for her starring roles on the television series Mentors, Edgemont and True Justice.

Life and career
Lind was born in Regina, Saskatchewan.

Lind's first major role was as Dee Sampson on the 1998 Canadian teen fantasy television series Mentors, which aired on Family Channel. After Mentors she was cast as Jen MacMahon, one of the lead roles, on the 2000 CBC teen drama series Edgemont, a role which she played through all five seasons of the show.

In 2005, Lind appeared in the titular role of Cody in the Canadian film Fetching Cody opposite Jay Baruchel, and played the lead, Rita, in the Canadian horror film Severed (also known as Severed: Forest of the Dead). The same year she appeared in the Canadian film A Simple Curve, and the television film Selling Innocence.

In 2011, Lind starred opposite Steven Seagal in the scripted crime television series True Justice, playing the role of Sarah Montgomery; she appeared in both seasons of the show. In 2015 she portrayed the titular role of Molly Hartley in the direct-to-video sequel The Exorcism of Molly Hartley, taking over the role from Haley Bennett in the original film. In 2016, Lind played the lead in the television film Hidden Truth. In 2018 she appeared in the film Last Night (also known as Shattered Memories). In 2020 Lind began playing Zee Madieras, a doctor and medical examiner, in the Hallmark Movies & Mysteries series The Martha's Vineyard Mysteries based on the novels by Philip R. Craig.

Filmography

Film

Television

References

External links

1982 births
Canadian film actresses
Canadian television actresses
Living people
Actresses from Regina, Saskatchewan